Dongli railway station is a railway station located in Fuli Township, Hualien County, Taiwan. It is located on the Taitung line and is operated by Taiwan Railways.

History

The railway station was originally constructed in the southeast of the current station building when the line was not yet rerouted. After the line was rerouted, the new station building was constructed to be what is the current Dongli railway station today and the old station was named Old Dongli railway station. The old station now serves as the southern end of the 9.8-km long Yufu Bikeway taking place of the old section of the railway line before the rerouting works.

On 18 September 2022, six coaches of the Tze-chiang limited express which was stopping at the station derailed cause by the 2022 Taitung earthquakes.

Around the station
 Dongli Story House

References

1924 establishments in Taiwan
Railway stations opened in 1924
Railway stations in Hualien County
Railway stations served by Taiwan Railways Administration